Jean Baptiste Louis Isambert (1838 - 22 February 1906) was a member of the Queensland Legislative Assembly.

Biography
Isambert was born at Zollhof, Germany, the son of John Baptiste Louis Isambert Snr and his wife Agnes (née McKanem). 
He owned a vineyard at Ipswich and was the proprietor of the Nord Australische Zeitung.

He died in February 1906 and was buried in the Cooktown Cemetery.

Public life
Isambert won the by-election for the seat of Rosewood in the Queensland Legislative Assembly in 1882 after the sitting member, Archibald Meston was declared bankrupt. He held the seat for 10 years, resigning in 1892.

References

Members of the Queensland Legislative Assembly
1838 births
1906 deaths
19th-century Australian politicians